The constituency of Wallis and Futuna is a French legislative constituency covering the whole of the overseas collectivity of Wallis and Futuna.  It is represented in the XVIth legislature by Mikaele Seo of Renaissance who defeated fellow centrist Etuato Mulikihaamea in the 2022 election.

Deputies

Election results

2022

2018 by-election

Napole Polutele's 2017 election was invalidated and a by-election held in 2018.  Only the first round of the election was required.

2017
 
 
 
  
 
 
 

Napole Polutele obtained sufficient votes to be elected in the first round.  Note, this election was later invalidated, leading to the 2018 by-election

2013 by-election
David Vergé's 2012 election was annulled due to financial irregularities, causing a by-election on 17 and 24 March 2013. Two candidates stood for the left, including Laurianne Vergé for the Socialists. She was the first woman ever to stand as a candidate for Parliament to represent the constituency – and was the wife of David Vergé, who had represented the other side of the political spectrum. Seeking to retain the seat for the right, Napole Polutele stood as an independent endorsed by the Union for a Popular Movement.

All three candidates received good enough results to advance to the second round, where Polutele received almost exactly the same result as in the first and was elected. Two months later, having been elected to sit on the opposition benches (albeit officially as an independent), he joined the ranks of the Socialist-led majority. He explained frankly that being a member of the majority would make it easier for him to lobby the government for funds and services for his constituents – who, he said, cared little for the left-right divide prevalent in metropolitan France. He subsequently sat as an independent on the benches of the left.

2012

2007

Sources and notes

 French Interior Ministry results website: 

French legislative constituencies